May Lo Mei Wei (born 1 September 1965) is a Hong Kong former actress.

Personal 
In 1986, Lo met singer Jacky Cheung during the filming of Devoted to You, a movie that they both starred in. On 15 February 1996, they married in London, England. They have two daughters, Zoe Cheung Yiu-wah (b. 2000) and Zia Cheung Yiu-huen (b. 2002).

Filmography
 Lady Supercop (1993) 
 Two of a Kind (1993)	
 Girls Without Tomorrow 2 (1992)	
 Once A Black Sheep (1992)	
 Operation Scorpio (1992)	
 The Unleaded Love (1992)	
 The Banquet (1991) (cameo)
 Dances With The Dragon (1991)	
 Erotic Ghost Story 2 (1991)	
 Happy Ghost 4 (1991)	
 The Last Blood (1991)	
 Son On The Run (1991)	
 Midnight Angel (1990)	
 No Risk, No Gain (1990)	
 Return Engagement (1990)	
 Story of Kennedy Town (1990)	
 City Kids (1989)	
 The Inspector Wears Skirts 2 (1989)	
 Miracles (1989) (cameo)
 Heart To Hearts (1988)	
 I'm Sorry (1988)	
 Picture Of A Nymph (1988)	
 The Goofy Gang (1987)	
 You OK, I'm OK ! (1987)	
 Devoted to You (1986)	
 My Family (1986)	
 Passion (1986)	
 Pom Pom Strikes Back (1986)	
 Happy Ghost 2 (1985)	
 The Isle Of Fantasy (1985)	
 Mismatched Couples (1985)	
 The Perfect Wife (1983)

References

External links
 Hong Kong cinemagic entry
 

1965 births
Living people
Hong Kong expatriates in the United Kingdom
Hong Kong film actresses
Hong Kong television actresses
20th-century Hong Kong actresses